Gautam Chand Sharma 'Vyathit' (born on 15 August 1938), also known as Gautam Sharma Vyathit or simply Gautam Vyathit, is a folklorist, playwright, and poet from Himachal Pradesh, India. He is noted for his literary works in Dogri and Hindi, as well as for his various efforts to preserve and nurture the endangered folk arts of Himachal Pradesh, especially those of the Kangra region. Vyathit was the joint recipient of the 2007 Sahitya Akademi Award (Bhasha Samman) for his contributions to Himachali languages and literature. 'Vyathit', Gautam Sharma's pen-name in Hindi, means 'pained', or 'distressed'.

Personal life 
Vyathit was born to Faquir Chand and Sheela Devi on August 15, 1938, at village Nerti in the Kangra district of erstwhile Punjab Province, British India. Nerti is now located in Kangra district, Himachal Pradesh, India. Vyathit did his primary schooling from Nerti, matriculation from the nearby village of Rait (1957), and B.A. (1965), B.Ed., and M.A. in Hindi (1968) from Punjab University. He ultimately earned a PhD in 1974, from the Guru Nanak Dev University in Punjab. His doctoral thesis was titled Literary evaluation and critical analysis of Kangri folk songs. He began his teaching career as a primary school teacher and proceeded to teach Hindi at Government College, Dharamshala for many years. Vyathit continues to live in Nerti.

Works

Kangra Lok Sahitya Parishad 
 Vyathit has been the founder-director of the NGO 'Kangra Lok Sahitya Parishad' (translated as Kangra folk literature council), established at Nerti in 1973. This NGO works for documenting and promoting the endangered folk arts of Himachal Pradesh. Its activities have included surveying and documenting these arts, and organizing cultural events including poetry recitals, folk theatre, folk dances, festivals, and publications. Vyathit has also developed an open-air theatre in Nerti, where the Parishad often hosts its activities.

Work on Kangri folklore 
 Vyathit's documentation and analyses of Kangra's folklore have been considered significant by scholars of disciplines including literature, anthropology, and folklore studies. These include Kirin Narayan, and Alan Dundes, besides others.

Poetry 
 Vyathit is widely considered a prominent poet from Himachal Pradesh. He writes in Dogri and Hindi. His poems revolve around rural life and nature in Kangra. Atma Ram notes that Vyathit expresses the 'vyatha' (suffering; from which the pen-name 'vyathit' is derived) of the common person in rural Kangra.

Promotion of Jhamakara folk dance 
 Since the early 1970s, Vyathit has been known for re-choreographing Kangra's Jhamakara folk-dance, which earlier used to be performed by women during marriage festivities only behind closed doors, and promoting this dance as a public art form.

Experimentation with and promotion of Kangri folk theatre 
 Vyathit is known for revitalizing Kangra's traditional folk-theatre, infusing it with current themes and challenging traditional norms of participation in these plays.

Linguistics 
 Vyathit contributed the sections on Kangri and Hindi for the Himachal Pradesh volume of the People's Linguistic Survey of India.

Others 
 Vyathit is a member of the Himachal Pradesh Brahmin Kalyan Board.

Recognition 
Some among the numerous awards received by Vyathit are the following:
 In 2007, Vyathit shared the Sahitya Academi Award (Bhasha Samman) with Pratyush Guleri for his contributions to the Himachali language and literature. 
 In 2014, Vyathit received the Shan-e-Himachal Award from Virbhadra Singh, then Chief Minister of Himachal Pradesh.
 In 2016, Vyathit received the Himachal Shiromani Samman from the Himachal Sanskritik Shodh Sansthan evam Natya Rangmandal.
 In 2022, Vyathit received the Himachal Gaurav Puraskar (Pride of Himachal Award) of the Government of Himachal Pradesh, from Jai Ram Thakur, then Chief Minister of the state.

Select Bibliography 

 (1973) Kangri Lok Geet. Palampur: Sheela Prakashan 
 (1973) Dholru: Himachal ki lok gathae.
 (1984) Kāṅgaṛā ke lokagīta, sāhityika viśleshaṇa evaṃ mūlyāṅkana. Jayaśrī prakāśana 
 (2000) Bharatiya sahitya ke nirmata: Baba Kanshi Ram. 
 (2006) Folklore of Himachal Pradesh. Delhi: National Book Trust.

References 

People from Kangra district
Writers from Himachal Pradesh
Poets from Himachal Pradesh
20th-century Indian male writers
21st-century Indian male writers
Indian folk-song collectors
Dogri-language writers
20th-century Indian linguists
21st-century Indian linguists
Guru Nanak Dev University alumni
Panjab University alumni